Euroleon is an antlion genus in the family Myrmeleontidae.

References

External links 

Myrmeleontidae genera
Myrmeleontinae